The Sonnino II government of Italy held office from 11 December 1909 until 31 March 1910, a total of 110 days, or 3 months and 20 days.

Government parties
The government was composed by the following parties:

The cabinet was externally supported by the Historical Left.

Composition

References

Italian governments
1909 establishments in Italy